Belisha may refer to:
 Leslie Hore-Belisha, a past UK Liberal Party  politician
 Belisha beacon, named after him

See also
 Belushi (disambiguation)
 Berisha (disambiguation)